La Società del Whist, modelled broadly on the gentleman's clubs of London and their Parisian analogues, was founded in March 1841 in the fashionable Caffè Fiorio in Turin, Italy, by Count Cavour and a number of his friends.

By contrast to previous clubs formed among Turin’s social elite, the Whist Club admitted upper middle class professionals—bankers, lawyers and academics—alongside the titled aristocracy. Nevertheless, at least ten of the forty founding members had ancestors who had belonged to the city's Patriottica Nobile Società del Casino: a club which had been not only strictly limited to the nobility but in effect to its more exclusive echelons, virtually excluding those whose titles post-dated 1722.

In 1947 it merged with the Accademia Filarmonica.

Notes

Clubs and societies in Italy
1841 establishments in Italy
Organizations disestablished in 1947
1841 establishments in the Kingdom of Sardinia
Organizations established in 1841